Świerznik is a former settlement in Gmina Miastko, Bytów County, Pomeranian Voivodeship, in northern Poland.

From 1975 to 1998 the village was in Słupsk Voivodeship.

References

Map of the Gmina Miastko

Villages in Bytów County